Abdulah "Avdo" Sumbul (27 April 1884 — 8 February 1915) was Serb Muslim literature journal editor and national activist in Austrian annexed Bosnia and Herzegovina. Sumbul belonged to a group of Serb Muslims who were targeted as enemies by Austria Hungary and persecuted because of their ethnicity. He died in Austro-Hungarian concentration camp in Arad.

Biography 
Sumbul and his family that included his sister, for certain period of time lived in the Sarajevo suburb known as Kovači.

Sumbul was one of the founders of Muslim Sokol movement in Sarajevo. He was member of Young Bosnia. In 1912, after the death of Osman Đikić, the editing of Gajret was entrusted to Avdo Sumbul. In 1914 he was one of the editors of the magazine Vakat, published in Sarajevo.

Vladimir Ćorović emphasize that government of Austria-Hungary perceived and treated Muslims who self-declared themselves as Serbs as enemies of the interest of their state and organized their systematic persecution. Because of his anti-Austrian and pro-Serbian activities, Sumbul was interned to concentration camp in Arad. where he soon died.

Legacy 
Sumbul's remains were transferred to Sarajevo where his grave is today, in the courtyard of Ali Pasha Mosque. In 1934, based on the order of Yugoslav king Alexander I of Yugoslavia, a turbe mausoleum was built in honor of Avdo Sumbul and Behdžed Mutavelić. This mausoleums are part of symbolic unity with Chapel of Vidovdan's martyrs on Koševo Christian Orthodox cemetery.

A street in Sarajevo bears Sumbul's name in his honor.

References

Sources 

 
 
 
 
 
 

1884 births
1915 deaths
Serbs of Bosnia and Herzegovina
Young Bosnia
Serbian people who died in prison custody
Prisoners who died in Austrian detention